Rana Radwan Al Mokdad (born 18 November 1998) is a Lebanese footballer who plays as a midfielder for Lebanese club SAS and the Lebanon national team.

International career 
Al Mokdad was called up to represent Lebanon at the 2022 WAFF Women's Championship, helping her side finish runners-up.

Career statistics

International
Scores and results list Lebanon's goal tally first, score column indicates score after each Al Mokdad goal.

Honours 
SAS
 Lebanese Women's Football League: 2018–19, 2019–20, 2021–22
 Lebanese Women's FA Cup: 2018–19
 WAFF Women's Clubs Championship runner-up: 2019
 Lebanese Women's Super Cup runner-up: 2018

Lebanon
 WAFF Women's Championship runner-up: 2022; third place: 2019

See also
 List of Lebanon women's international footballers

References

External links

 
 

1998 births
Living people
People from Byblos District
Lebanese women's footballers
Lebanon women's international footballers
Women's association football midfielders
Lebanese Women's Football League players
Stars Association for Sports players